Treaty of Stettin (Szczecin) may refer to:
Treaty of Stettin (1570), ending the Northern Seven Years' War
Treaty of Stettin (1630), settling the conditions of Swedish occupation of the Duchy of Pomerania during the Thirty Years' War
Treaty of Stettin (1653), settling territorial disputes of Brandenburg and Sweden in Pomerania after the Thirty Years' War
Treaty of Stettin (1715), a Hanoveranian-Prussian alliance during the Great Northern War